Jürg Wittwer (born 25 July 1959) is a retired Swiss football defender.

Honours
Swiss Super League:
Winner: 1985–86
Swiss Super Cup:
Winner: 1986
Swiss Cup:
Winner: 1986–87

References

1959 births
Living people
Swiss men's footballers
BSC Young Boys players
Association football defenders
Swiss Super League players
Switzerland international footballers